Rona Morison is a Scottish actress having had roles playing Chell Our Ladies in 2019 and as Thompson in Absentia 2020.

Early life and career
Morison was born and raised very close to Glasgow in Scotland. Morison attended St Columba's School in Kilmacolm, then joined the Scottish Youth Theatre to hone her acting skills,  before being accepted into the Guildhall School of Music and Drama in London at the age of 17.
She graduated from the Guildhall School of Music & Drama in 2011, after attending workshops with Charlotte Munkso at Prima del Teatro and with the Royal Shakespeare Company.

Between roles, Morison doubles as an acting teacher at the Fontainebleau School of Acting in Fontainebleau just outside of Paris, France.

In 2020, Morison appeared in a main role as Chell in the Michael Caton-Jones directed Our Ladies, the world premiere of which, was held at the 2019 BFI London Film Festival on 4 October. and was later screened at the 2020 Glasgow Film Festival.

Theatre career
Morison's theatre career has included appearing in Scuttlers at the Royal Exchange Theatre, To Kill a Mockingbird at the Open Air Theatre in Regent's Park, Illusions at the Bush Theatre, The Second Mrs Tanqueray at Rose Theatre in Kingston.
Morison played the lead role of 15-year-old Minnie in the 2017 in a play based on the Phoebe Gloeckner novel and Marielle Heller film The Diary of a Teenage Girl, at the Southwark Playhouse. Morison performed another lead role in the 2018 production of The Prime of Miss Jean Brodie at the Donmar Warehouse. 
Morison received a nomination at the 2018 Evening Standard Theatre Awards for the Emerging Talent Award for her performance as Sandy in The Prime of Miss Jean Brodie at the Donmar Warehouse in 2018.

Morison has appeared in The Haystack at the Hampstead Theatre in 2020  In 2022, Morison starred as Danni in the Glasgow based 3-part BBC drama thriller The Control Room

Filmography

Film

Television

Awards and nominations

References

External links

Curtis Brown Profile

Living people
People educated at St Columba's School, Kilmacolm
21st-century Scottish actresses
Alumni of the Guildhall School of Music and Drama
Scottish television actresses
Scottish film actresses
1990 births